The 1969 European Amateur Team Championship took place 26–29 June at Hamburger Golf Club – Falkenstein, 20 kilometres west of central Hamburg, Germany. It was the sixth men's golf European Amateur Team Championship.

Format 
All participating teams played one qualification round of stroke-play with up to six players, counted the five best scores for each team.

The eight best teams formed flight A, in knock-out match-play over the next three days. The teams were seeded based on their positions after the stroke play. Each of the four best placed teams were drawn to play the quarter final against one of the teams in the flight placed in the next four positions. In each match between two nation teams, two 18-hole foursome games and five 18-hole single games were played. Teams were allowed to switch players during the team matches, selecting other players in to the afternoon single matches after the morning foursome matches.

The six teams placed 9–14 in the qualification stroke-play formed Flight B to play similar knock-out play and the four teams placed 15–18 formed Flight C to meet each other, to decide their final positions.

Teams 
18 nation teams contested the event. Each team consisted of five or six players.

Players in the leading teams

Other participating teams

Winners 
England won the gold medal, earning their second title, beating host country West Germany 4.5–2.5 in the final. Defending champions team Ireland earned the bronze on third place, after beating Italy 5.5–1.5 in the bronze match.

Individual leader in the opening 18-hole stroke-play qualifying competition was Gordon Cosh, Scotland, with a course record score of 3-under-par 68, one stroke ahead of Tom Craddock, Ireland. There was no official award for the lowest individual score.

Results 
Qualification round

Team standings

* Note: In the event of a tie the order was determined by the better non-counting score.

Individual leaders

 Note: There was no official award for the lowest individual score.

Flight A

Bracket

Final games

* Note: Game declared halved, since team match already decided.

Flight B

Bracket

Flight C

Round 1

Round 2

Round 3

Final standings

Sources:

See also 

 Eisenhower Trophy – biennial world amateur team golf championship for men organized by the International Golf Federation.
 European Ladies' Team Championship – European amateur team golf championship for women organised by the European Golf Association.

References

External links 
European Golf Association: Full results

European Amateur Team Championship
Golf tournaments in Germany
European Amateur Team Championship
European Amateur Team Championship
European Amateur Team Championship